Mado, Hold for Pick Up is a French-Soviet romantic drama 1990, directorial debut of Aleksandr Adabashyan. The film is based on the novel by Simone Arèse Mado.

Plot 
In a French provincial town where everyone knows each other for years and nothing ever happens, lives a young overweight woman by the name of Mado (Marianne Groves). She works as a mail carrier. Mado also teaches at a local school, where she tells fables to children. She is innocent and pure like a child and is dreaming of a beautiful prince. One day director Jean-Marie Zeleni (Oleg Yankovsky) comes to the village to search for locations for his new film, and thus becomes the "prince" for Mado. She immediately invites him to dinner, but realizing her unattractiveness, takes with herself her friend Germain (Isabelle Gélinas), a local prostitute. The slim and charming Germain immediately evokes the director's liking, and Mado can only observe their relationship. Then it turns out that the object of Mado's girlish dreams is a failed film director who shoots now commercials instead of feature films. Having filmed the next ad, he leaves, and Mado has only to watch from afar his touching farewell to Germain. From desperation she decides to drown herself, but then sets this thought aside and only watches from the river as the people of the village begin to be really worried about her.

Cast
Marianne Groves as Mado
Oleg Yankovsky as director Jean-Marie Zeleni
Jean-Pierre Darroussin as shepherd
Isabelle Gélinas as Germain
Bernard Freud as the priest
Michel Vinogradov as Henri Lamont
Olivier Pajot as Belfour
André Pomarat as  Perduvent

Awards 
 1990 — Special Prize at the Cannes Film Festival  Prospect of French cinema 
 1990 — Prize of the Youth Jury - Aleksandr Adabashyan, IFF  Europe Cinema in Ravenna

References

External links
 

1990s Russian-language films
1990s French-language films
1990 directorial debut films
French romantic drama films
1990 romantic drama films
1990 films
Soviet romantic drama films
Russian romantic drama films
1990s French films